Eupromerini is a tribe of longhorn beetles of the subfamily Lamiinae.

Taxonomy
 Eupromera
 Iquiracetima
 Neopibanga
 Pibanga
 Puanama

References

Lamiinae